Broken is a 2019 American investigative documentary television program from Netflix. The program was produced by Zero Point Zero Production. The program consisted of four episodes – two of which were directed by Sarah Holm Johansen and two by Steve Rivo. The program was released on Netflix on November 27, 2019. Each episode deals with one industry and shows interviews with manufacturers, distributors, and others involved in the process. It also highlights several criminal cases brought against these people.

Episodes

Reception 
Reaction to the program has been relatively positive. It is praised for its compelling, human-centered narratives but criticized for focusing on particular issues rather than providing explanation for wider industry problems, or giving the viewer answers as to which brands and products are unaffected by the issues the program presents.

References

External links 
  
 
 
 

2010s American documentary television series
2019 American television series debuts
Netflix original documentary television series
English-language Netflix original programming